Orel Dgani (born 8 January 1989) is an Israeli footballer who plays for Beitar Jerusalem.

Early life
Dgain was born in Pardes Hanna-Karkur, Israel, to a Moroccan-Jewish family.

Career
Dgani is a protégé of Maccabi Netanya youth ranks and in 2008 he became a permanent player in the senior team. In 2010, he was appointed as the captain of the team.

On 31 August 2011 he signed a four-year contract with Maccabi Haifa for a fee of $1m.

In the 2013–14 season he was on loan at Hapoel Tel Aviv.
 
On 4 August 2020 he signed a three years contract at Beitar Jerusalem.

Honours

Club
Maccabi Haifa
Israel State Cup (1): 2015–16

Club career statistics
(correct as of 1 June 2022)

References

External links

1989 births
Living people
Israeli Mizrahi Jews
Israeli footballers
Israel international footballers
Maccabi Netanya F.C. players
Maccabi Haifa F.C. players
Hapoel Tel Aviv F.C. players
Beitar Jerusalem F.C. players
Israeli Premier League players
Liga Leumit players
People from Pardes Hanna-Karkur
Association football defenders
Israeli people of Moroccan-Jewish descent